Dongwangpo Township is a township of Pingshan County in the eastern foothills of the Taihang Mountains in western Hebei province, China. , it has 35 villages under its administration.

See also
List of township-level divisions of Hebei

References

Township-level divisions of Hebei
Pingshan County, Hebei